Thimble Summer is a novel by Elizabeth Enright that won the 1939 Newbery Medal. It is set in Depression-era rural Wisconsin.

The very evening that nine-year-old Garnet Linden finds a silver thimble in a dried-up riverbed near the farm where she lives, the drought that has threatened her family's financial future is broken with a rainstorm. The days that follow are filled with exciting events: the Lindens come by money to rebuild their barn, Garnet's pig wins a blue ribbon at the fair, and a young boy named Eric comes to live with the Lindens as their adopted son.

When the time comes for the show, Garnet is stuck on the Ferris wheel. She can't get down for almost another hour, and the show starts in thirty minutes.

The summer is so wonderful that Garnet comes to believe that the thimble had magical powers, and she vows to remember that time as her "thimble summer."

In another chapter, "Locked In," Garnet and her friend, Citronella, stay too long at the library and are locked in for the night.

References

1938 American novels
1938 children's books
American children's novels
Newbery Medal–winning works
Novels set in Wisconsin
Great Depression novels
Farrar & Rinehart books